Tabitha Skelly Peterson (born March 6, 1989) is an American curler from Minneapolis, Minnesota. She was a bronze medalist at the 2010 World Junior Championships and is a two-time women's national champion. She currently is skip of her own team, having traded positions with Nina Roth during the 2020 off-season.

Career

Junior
As a junior, Peterson was a four-time state champion curler and won U.S. national junior championships in 2009 and 2010. In 2009, Peterson played third on her junior rink, skipped by Alexandra Carlson. After winning the U.S. junior title, the team would represent the United States at the 2009 World Junior Curling Championships. The team finished the round robin with a 4–5 record, finishing 5th. In 2010, the Carlson rink won another U.S. junior title, sending the team to the 2010 World Junior Curling Championships. At the 2010 World Juniors, the team finished the round robin in a tie for third place with a 6–3 record. The team won their first playoff match against Switzerland's Manuela Siegrist before losing in the semi-final to Sweden's Anna Hasselborg. That demoted the team to the bronze medal game, where they defeated Switzerland again to finish third overall.

2010–2014
After her junior career ended in 2010, Peterson joined the Allison Pottinger rink at lead position. In their first year together, the team lost in the final of the 2011 United States Women's Curling Championship to Patti Lank. The following season, they avenged this loss by beating Cassandra Johnson's rink to win the 2012 United States Women's Curling Championship. This sent the Pottinger team to the 2012 Ford World Women's Curling Championship to represent the U.S. The team finished the round robin at the 2012 Worlds in a tie with Canada's Heather Nedohin for fourth place and a 7–4 record. However, Canada beat the team in the tie-breaker, forcing the U.S. to settle for 5th. The following season, the team won a bronze medal at the 2013 United States Women's Curling Championship. The team found more success in the 2013–14 season. They won one World Curling Tour (WCT) event over the season, the 2013 Kamloops Crown of Curling. Their success on the World Curling Tour gave them enough points to qualify for the 2014 Ford World Women's Curling Championship, following new rules made by the United States Curling Association, which based World Championship qualifying on Order of Merit points rather than winning the U.S. Championship. At World's Team Pottinger finished sixth, with a record of 6–5. As for the U.S. Championship that season, the team ended up losing in the final to Nina Spatola (now Nina Roth).

2014–2019
For the 2014–15 season, Peterson joined Nina Roth as lead. Team Roth finished fifth at the 2015 National Championship just outside of the playoffs. Peterson claimed another World Curling Tour event win at the 2014 Twin Cities Open.

At the 2016 National Championship, Peterson played third for skip Jamie Sinclair. The team finished the round robin with a 5–1 record but lost in the page playoff 3v4 game to Cory Christensen's team. The US Champion team, skipped by Erika Brown, added Peterson as alternate for the 2016 World Championships, where the team finished 6th. Also in 2016 Peterson joined with Joe Polo to compete at the United States Mixed Doubles World Trials. They finished with an impressive 9–1 record, earning them a spot at the 2016 World Mixed Doubles Championship in Karlstad, Sweden. Peterson and Polo finished the round robin group play undefeated, losing to Team Russia in the semifinals. In the bronze medal match, they defeated Team Scotland 9–7.

For the 2016–17 season, Peterson was back playing with Roth's women's team, this time as third. Team Roth won the Molson Cash Spiel that year, a WCT event. At the 2017 National Championship, they earned a silver medal when they lost to their former teammate Jamie Sinclair in the final. Peterson's team represented the United States at the 2017 Americas Challenge, where they beat Brazil to qualify the U.S. for the 2017 World Championship. Due to the United States Curling Association's point system at the time, they also got to compete at the 2017 World's despite not being the National Champions. At World's Peterson and Team USA finished fifth with a record of 6–5.

At the 2017 US Mixed Doubles Championship, Peterson and teammate Joe Polo earned the silver medal losing to the brother and sister duo of Matt and Becca Hamilton in the final. Later in 2017, Peterson and Polo competed at the first United States Mixed Doubles Olympic Trials, where they finished tied for fifth with a record of 3–4.

Just a month before competing at the Mixed Doubles Olympic Trials, Peterson and her women's team defeated Jamie Sinclair's team in a best-of-three final at the 2017 United States Olympic Curling Trials to earn the right to represent the United States at the 2018 Winter Olympics. At the Olympics, Team Roth finished with a 4–5 record, missing the playoffs. Due to competing at the Olympics, Team Roth opted not to compete in the 2018 US National Championships.

In 2019 Peterson returned to both the United States Women's Championship and Mixed Doubles Championship. In a repeat of the 2017 National Championship final, Peterson's women's team of Nina Roth, Becca Hamilton, and sister Tara Peterson lost to Jamie Sinclair in the final. At the Mixed Doubles Championship, Peterson and Polo went undefeated through the round robin section of the tournament but ultimately lost in the semifinal to eventual champions Cory Christensen and John Shuster.

2019–present
Peterson skipped Team Roth during the 2019–20 season as Nina Roth was on maternity leave. They had a semifinal finish at the 2019 Tour Challenge Grand Slam event. At the 2020 United States Women's Championship, Peterson earned her second national title and first as skip. In the round robin, Team Peterson's only loss came against Jamie Sinclair, but they then beat Team Sinclair in the 1 vs. 2 page playoff game and again in the final. As United States Champions Team Peterson would have represented the United States at the 2020 World Women's Curling Championship, but they lost that opportunity when the Championship was cancelled due to the COVID-19 pandemic. They also earned a spot at the final Grand Slam of the season, the Champions Cup, which was also cancelled due to the pandemic. Their qualification will instead carry over to the 2021 Champions Cup.

At the 2020 US Mixed Doubles Championship, Peterson and Polo again faced Christensen and Shuster, but this time in the final, and they won 7–4. This was their first mixed doubles national title and earned them a spot at the 2020 World Mixed Doubles Curling Championship and the 2021 United States mixed doubles curling Olympic trials. But about a month before the World Championship was supposed to begin the World Curling Federation announced its cancellation due to the ongoing COVID-19 pandemic. The following year the United States Curling Association announced that the 2021 US Mixed Doubles Championship would be postponed until after the 2021 World Mixed Doubles due to the pandemic, and so as 2020 national champions Peterson and Polo were invited to represent the United States at the 2021 Worlds.

During the 2020 off-season, the team announced that Peterson would remain as skip when Roth returned from maternity leave. Roth re-joined the team as vice-skip at third, with Hamilton moving to second, Tara Peterson to lead, and Geving to alternate. Due to the COVID-19 pandemic, the Peterson team did not compete in events for most of the 2020–21 season until entering a bio-secure bubble held in Calgary, Alberta in the spring of 2021 for three events in a row. The first two events were the Champions Cup and Players' Championship grand slams, with Peterson missing the playoffs at both. The third event in the Calgary bubble for Team Peterson was the 2021 World Women's Championship, in which they earned a spot as 2020 National Champions after the 2021 National Championship was moved to later in the spring due to the pandemic. They finished the 13 game round-robin in fifth place with a 7–6 record, earning them a spot in the playoffs and securing a 2022 Olympic berth for the United States. In the playoffs, Team Peterson defeated Denmark's Madeline Dupont but lost to Switzerland's Silvana Tirinzoni to end up in the bronze medal game. There, Peterson faced off against Sweden's Anna Hasselborg and won with a score of 9–5, including scoring five points in the seventh end. Team Peterson's bronze medal finish was the first World Women's medal for the United States in 15 years, and the first-ever bronze medal. Right after the World Championship, Peterson traveled to Aberdeen, Scotland to compete in the 2021 World Mixed Doubles Curling Championship with Joe Polo. There, the pair finished the round robin with a 5–4 record. This put them in a qualification game against Czech Republic for the seventh direct spot at the 2022 Winter Olympics, which they lost 8–6.

The Peterson rink won their first two events of the 2021–22 season, the US Open of Curling and the 2021 Curlers Corner Autumn Gold Curling Classic. The following week, they played in the 2021 Masters where they made it as far as the quarterfinals. The team then played in the 2021 United States Olympic Curling Trials, where they attempted to return to the Olympics. The team posted a 9–1 record through the round robin, putting them into the best-of-three final against Cory Christensen. The Peterson rink beat Christensen in two-straight games, booking their tickets to the 2022 Winter Olympics. After the Trials, the team played in one event before the Olympics, the Curl Mesabi Classic, which they won, beating Christensen again in the final. At the Olympics, Peterson led the United States to a 4–5 record, missing the playoffs. The team finished off the season by playing in two Slams, the 2022 Players' Championship and the 2022 Champions Cup, missing the playoffs in both events. In mixed doubles that season, she and Joe Polo played in the 2021 United States mixed doubles curling Olympic trials, where they posted a 5–4 round robin record. This put them in a tiebreaker, which they won. In the 3 vs. 4 game, they were not as successful, losing to Jamie Sinclair and Rich Ruohonen.

Personal life
Peterson studied at the Minnesota College of Pharmacy. She is currently employed as a pharmacist. Her sister is fellow curler Tara Peterson.

Teams

Women's

Mixed doubles

Grand Slam record

Former events

References

External links

Living people
1989 births
American female curlers
Continental Cup of Curling participants
American curling champions
People from Burnsville, Minnesota
People from Eagan, Minnesota
Curlers at the 2018 Winter Olympics
Olympic curlers of the United States
Sportspeople from Minneapolis
21st-century American women
Curlers at the 2022 Winter Olympics